"Hotride" (sometimes written as "Hot Ride") is the fifteenth single released by the British electronic music trio the Prodigy on 1 November 2004. It was the second single from the album Always Outnumbered, Never Outgunned and did not enter the UK Singles Chart as the CD was released in EP format with 3 additional B-sides and so did not conform to chart regulations. In Ireland, however, the song was eligible to chart, debuting and peaking at number 40 on the week dated 11 November.

The track featured vocals by Juliette Lewis and borrowed lyrics from Jimmy Webb's "Up, Up and Away (In My Beautiful Balloon)".

Music video
The single's music video was directed by Daniel Levi, but was rejected by Liam Howlett due to the amount of pointless violence.

The video concentrates on a group of Japanese children going on a rampage. The kids first vandalize a nearby automobile, take pills of an unknown substance (possibly drugs), beat up a policeman and put him in the trunk of the car, and subsequently kidnap a woman before heading to an office building, where they knock out the guards and destroy the offices. The kidnapped woman then escapes and calls the police. An anti-terrorist squad enters the building and catches the kids.

Track listings
XL recordings CD single
 "Hotride" (4:32)
 "Who U Foolin" (3:40)
 "Girls" (six minute Remix) (6:33)
 "Hotride" (El Batori Mix) (4:44)

US promo
 "Hotride" (Radio Edit) (3:38)
 "Hotride" (El Batori Mix 3) (4:44)
 "Hotride" (El Batori Mix 2) (5:23)
 "Hotride" (El Batori Mix 1) (4:55)
 "Hotride" (Album Version) (4:36)

Charts

References

The Prodigy songs
2004 singles
2004 songs
Electronic rock songs
Songs written by Liam Howlett
XL Recordings singles